Bob Griffin may refer to:
Bob F. Griffin (1935–2021), Speaker of the Missouri House of Representatives
Bob Griffin (American football coach) (born 1940), head coach of the Idaho State and Rhode Island Rams football teams
Bob Griffin (basketball) (born 1950), American-Israeli basketball player, and English literature professor
Bob Griffin (linebacker) (1929–2012), American football linebacker
Bob Griffin (NASCAR) (1895–1979), NASCAR team owner
Bob Griffin (born 1959), bassist with the BoDeans

See also
Robert Griffin (disambiguation)